Basilides of Tyre  was a mathematician, mentioned by Hypsicles in his prefatory letter of Euclid's Elements, Book XIV. Barnes and Brunschwig suggested that Basilides of Tyre and Basilides the Epicurean could be the same Basilides.

Life
From Hypsicles letter it appears plausible that a Basilides of Tyre has met Hypsicles and his father, perhaps in Alexandria, a central point for mathematicians at the times. 
Basilides letter is part of the supplement taken from Euclid's Book XIV, written by Hypsicles.

See also
Tyre, Lebanon

References

Ancient Greek mathematicians